Tal Mosseri (born August 30, 1975) is an Israeli actor, singer and television presenter.

Biography
Mosseri was born in Tel Aviv, Israel, to a Jewish family. He attended Thelma Yellin high school and studied acting at Tel Aviv Arts School. Before serving in the Israel Defense Forces, Mosseri was a member of a music band called Tzeirei Tel Aviv (Youth of Tel Aviv).

In September 2005, Mosseri married Noam Ben-Gurion (granddaughter of David Ben-Gurion's nephew). They have two sons and a daughter.

Mosseri is the older brother of actor and voice dubber Ido Mosseri.

Television career

Mosseri joined Arutz HaYeladim (The Kids' Channel) as a presenter in 1997. He left the channel in 2015 after 18 years, holding the record for the longest tenure of any presenter in the channel's history.

See also
Television in Israel

References

External links
 
 

1975 births
Living people
Israeli Ashkenazi Jews
Israeli Sephardi Jews  
Israeli male musical theatre actors
Israeli male stage actors
Israeli male television actors
Israeli male voice actors
Israeli television presenters
Male actors from Tel Aviv  
Jewish singers
Israeli Mizrahi Jews
Thelma Yellin High School of Arts alumni
20th-century Israeli male actors
21st-century Israeli male actors
20th-century Israeli male singers